Shenkar College of Engineering, Design and Art (commonly abbreviated as Shenkar) is a public college in Ramat Gan, Israel. Shenkar serves the Israeli industry by providing academic qualification and R&D services for modern industries.
Shenkar is also considered as the top design school in Israel.

History
Shenkar was established in 1970, with the goal of serving Israeli industry. The college is named after Aryeh Shenkar, founder and first president of the Manufacturers Association of Israel (formerly Industrialists' Union in The Land of Israel)  and a pioneer in the Israeli textile industry. Shenkar has three faculties: Multidisciplinary Art, Design and Engineering. Shenkar faculties offer  four-year undergraduate degrees, taught in Hebrew. The design and the engineering faculties offer postgraduate degrees in design and in plastics engineering, respectively.

Shenkar is accredited by the Council for Higher Education in Israel as an institute of higher education and its three faculties are authorized to award bachelor's degrees in Fine Arts, design and engineering. The school, in cooperation with Israel's Industry, Trade and Labor Ministry and National Institute for Technological Training, operates a Practical Engineering school, which is located in Tel Aviv, outside of Shenkar's main campus.

According to Fashionista magazine, Shenkar is ranked 15th in "The Top 50 Fashion Schools In The World" list, as of 2010.

Classroom and research facilities
The main campus, in Ramat Gan, consists mainly of two buildings. First, is the Frances and David Pernick Building. The Pernick Building was the first building that Shenkar occupied when the college was established in 1970. Back then, the building was an ORT high-school building that was no longer in use. In 1990, the building was renamed in honor of Frances and David Pernick. The second building is the Edward D. and Anna Mitchell Building. It was inaugurated in 2002 and built with the help of the Mitchell Foundation, the Lorber family and the Manufacturers Association of Israel. The seven-story building, which also has two underground levels, houses classrooms, and seminar rooms for design and engineering.

Outside of the main campus is the fine arts building. It is located in the Israeli Diamond Exchange District (approximately 800 meters from the main campus) and was formerly utilized as the 'Elite building'.

Shenkar's research facilities:
Rose Archive for Textiles and Costumes
Kadar Design and Technology Center
The Edelstein Center for the Analysis of Ancient Artifacts
The Joe Weinstein Center for Research in Medical Textiles
Textile Testing Laboratories
Design Research Center
Rapid Prototype Center
Nanotechnology Center
Center for Nonwovens
Green Design & Technologies
 

Other facilities are:
The Shenkar Forum for Culture and Society
CIM Laboratory
The Sidney & Anita Bernstein Library

Student union
Shenkar's Student Association is an independent, self-governing student body. Members also belong to the National Union of Israeli Students and benefit from all the advantages afforded to students in Israel and abroad. Shenkar offers students diversified financial support in sports, cultural, educational and social programs.

Alumni
The Alumni Association of Shenkar was founded in 2009 as a non-profit organization. Its goal is to aid the alumni by creating a connection array, which would support joint interests, continuing business success and the empowerment of Shenkar's alumni reputation.

Notable alumni
Inbal Dror
Alber Elbaz
Hila Klein
Nili Lotan

Notable faculty
Uri Tzaig
Yigal Zalmona
Mel Rosenberg

Faculties and Departments
Shenkar is accredited as an institution of higher education and is authorized to award the following degrees:

Engineering faculty (awards with B.Sc. or M.Sc. degree)
Bachelor of Science in Software Engineering
Bachelor of Science in Industrial Engineering and Management
Bachelor of Science and Master of Science in Plastics Engineering
Bachelor of Science in Chemical Engineering
Bachelor of Science in Electronics Engineering
 

Department of Multidisciplinary Art
Bachelor of Fine Arts in Multidisciplinary Art.

The Azrieli Faculty Of Design (awards with B.Des. degree or M.Des. Degree)
Bachelor of Design in Textile Design
Bachelor of Design in Fashion Design
Bachelor of Design in Jewelry Design
Bachelor of Design in Industrial Design
Bachelor of Design in Interior - Building and Environment Design
Bachelor of Design in Visual Communication
Master of Design in Design

See also
Education in Israel
List of universities and colleges in Israel

References

External links
Shenkar College of Engineering and Design
Shenkar School of Practical Engineering
Shenkar's Flickr page. Contains some of the students' work and exhibits.
TEDx Shenkar College

Colleges in Israel
Art schools in Israel
Engineering universities and colleges in Israel
Educational institutions established in 1970
1970 establishments in Israel
Buildings and structures in Ramat Gan
Design schools
Fashion schools
Israeli fashion